Seversky (masculine), Severskaya (feminine), or Severskoye (neuter) may refer to:
Alexander P. de Seversky (1894–1974), Russian-American aviation pioneer
Seversky Aircraft, the aircraft company founded by de Seversky, which later became Republic Aviation
Seversky District, a district of Krasnodar Krai, Russia
Seversky (inhabited locality) (Severskaya, Severskoye), name of several rural localities in Russia
Severskoye, Azerbaijan, a village in Azerbaijan

See also
Seversk